Julien Puricelli (born 1 August 1981) is a French rugby union player. Puricelli, who is a flanker, plays his club rugby for Lyon in the Top 14 following a spell at Bayonne. He made his debut for France against New Zealand on 13 June 2009.

References

External links
 Julien Puricelli Official Website
FFR profile 

1981 births
Living people
Sportspeople from Grenoble
French rugby union players
France international rugby union players
Rugby union flankers